Hamzehabad-e Sofla (also Romanized as Ḩamzehābād-e Soflá; also known as Ḩamzehābād-e Pāīn) is a village in Lahijan-e Gharbi Rural District, Lajan District, Piranshahr County, West Azerbaijan Province, Iran. At the 2006 census, its population was 137, in 16 families.

References 

Populated places in Piranshahr County